Gordon Martin may refer to:

 Cyril Gordon Martin, English soldier
 Gordon Beattie Martin, Saskatchewan legislator
 Gordon Eugene Martin, American physicist